Dorababu Pendem is an Indian politician and member of the YSR Congress Party. He was a member of the Andhra Pradesh Legislative Assembly from the Pithapuram constituency in East Godavari district on YSR Congress Party ticket from 23 May 2019.

He was a member of the Andhra Pradesh Legislative Assembly from the Pithapuram constituency in East Godavari district on Bharatiya Janata Party ticket from 2004 to 2009.
He joined YSR Congress Party in 2012 and contested the 2014 Andhra Pradesh Assembly elections from Pithapuram constituency and lost. Notably he is one of the close associates of Late Mr. Y. S. Rajasekhar Reddy.

References 

People from East Godavari district
YSR Congress Party politicians
Bharatiya Janata Party politicians from Andhra Pradesh
Living people
Telugu politicians
21st-century Indian politicians
Year of birth missing (living people)
Andhra Pradesh MLAs 2019–2024